Lisa Pardon (born 22 May 1982 in Auckland, New Zealand) is a basketball player for New Zealand. At the 2006 Commonwealth Games she won a silver medal as part of the Tall Ferns New Zealand women's basketball team.

She currently plays for the Bulleen Boomers women's basketball team, and was acknowledged as having the Best 3-point Shooting Percentage in the WNBL for the 2008/09 season.

References

1982 births
Living people
New Zealand women's basketball players
Basketball players at the 2006 Commonwealth Games
Commonwealth Games silver medallists for New Zealand
Basketball players at the 2008 Summer Olympics
Basketball players from Auckland
Olympic basketball players of New Zealand
Commonwealth Games medallists in basketball
Expatriate basketball people in Australia
Medallists at the 2006 Commonwealth Games